The wildlife of Zimbabwe occurs foremost in remote or rugged terrain, in national parks and private wildlife ranches, in miombo woodlands and thorny acacia or kopje. The prominent wild fauna includes African buffalo, African bush elephant, black rhinoceros, southern giraffe, African leopard, lion, plains zebra, and several antelope species.

The introduction of the Wildlife Conservation Act of 1960 resulted in checking the loss of wildlife in Zimbabwe, since the 1960s. In the 1990s, it became one of the leading countries in Africa in wildlife conservation and management with a reported income generation US$300 million per year from the protected areas of the state, rural community run wildlife management areas and private game ranches and reserves. The Parks and Wildlife Board consisting of 12 members is responsible for this activity and deciding on policy issues under the Ministry of Environment and Natural Resources Management.

The Zimbabwe Parks and Wildlife Management Authority under the Board has the onerous task of overseeing the activities related to 10 national parks, nine recreational parks, four botanical gardens, four safari areas, and three sanctuaries.

However, reports of National Geographic News indicate a disturbing trend of decimation of wildlife in Zimbabwe as result of “national economic meltdown” leading to overexploitation of the wildlife resources to meet the finances of the nation.

Legal codes
The Wildlife Conservation Authority initially protected and preserved wildlife in Zimbabwe as "king's game", which was changed to total state control subsequently. However, this created difficulties to the local population who were entirely dependent on the forests for their survival, as they were excluded from using indigenous wildlife resources and also gradually excluded from almost one-half of the country's land base. This seriously affected the sustainable exploitation of the wildlife resources as local people resorted to illegal poaching. However, in the 1960 the economic awareness created a policy shift in managing the wild life in the country when the Wildlife Conservation Act was introduced. This was followed by the Parks and Wildlife Act of 1975, which enabled the land owners "the right to manage wildlife for their own benefit, thus providing an economic rationale to reinforce the scientific, aesthetic and moral justifications for wildlife conservation." The Parks and Wildlife Act of 1975 has been amended and consolidated in 1982 in which certain animals to be protected have been listed. Taking off animals has been prohibited except under special permit issued by the minister for scientific or educational purposes or for captive breeding of falcons, live export, and re-stocking, wildlife management or defence of property. Provision also includes taking of indigenous plants, hunting of animals and regulation of fishing. Detailed regulations have been issued to the Act.

Wildlife estate
The Wildlife Estate includes eleven national parks: the Chimanimani National Park (including the Eland Sanctuary), Chizarira National Park, the Gonarezhou National Park, the Hwange National Park, the Kazuma Pan National Park, the Mana Pools National Park, the Matusadona National Park, the Matobo National Park, the Nyanga National Park, and Victoria Falls National Park and Zambezi National Parks.

Chimanimani National Park

Chimanimani National Park borders Mozambique in the southernmost area of the Eastern Highlands. There are also views of the Pork Pie mountain range and the Bridal Veil Falls, which plunges  down into a base about 10 m wide. The virgin forest cover is dense of the moist evergreen type. It is approachable only by trekking along hill tracks. It has many wild life fauna such as eland, sable, bushbuck, blue duiker, klipspringer and also spotted leopard, apart from butterflies, birds, snakes and shy cats.

Chizarira National Park
Though it is one of the largest parks, its location is in the remote Zambezi Escarpment and has extensive vistas including of its valleys, gorges, plateaus and flood plains. Its large game includes elephant, lion, leopard and buffalo. Its bird species are the big five birds namely, the African broadbill, Livingstone's flycatcher, western nicator, emerald cuckoo, apart from Angolan pitta and the Taita falcon.

Gonarezhou National Park

The park's habitat consists of baobabs, scrub lands and sandstone cliffs in the lowveld region. The park is very large, in rugged terrain, and hence remains unaffected by human interference. The park is within the ambit of the transboundary part of the Great Limpopo Transfrontier Park, a peace park that links Gonarezhou with the Kruger National Park in South Africa and the Limpopo National Park in Mozambique. Animals move freely between the three sanctuaries. The park's rich wild life consists of 500 species of birds, 147 species of mammals, more than 116 species of reptiles, 34 species of frogs and 49 species of fish. The park's rivers and pools have some unique species of aqua fauna such as the Zambezi shark, freshwater goby, black bream and the turquoise killifish.

Hwange National Park

The park lies on the main road between Bulawayo and the widely noted Victoria Falls. In the 19th century it was the hunting ground of the Ndebele warrior-king Mzilikazi and it is named after the local Nhanzwa chief. The park is close to the edge of the Kalahari desert, a region with little water and very sparse, xerophile vegetation. While the park abounds in elephant population (one of the largest in the world), it also hosts 100 mammal species, including 19 large herbivores and eight large carnivores and 400 bird species; Zimbabwe's specially protected animals are all found here. Gemsbok, brown hyena and African wild dogs occur in fairly large numbers (the population of African wild dogs is stated to be of one of the largest surviving groups in Africa now). The very large elephant population has been a matter of concern since, during drought years, they are a burden on the ecological balance of the region. Elephant culling has been done to restrict the population of elephants to 13,000 (less than 1 per km2); against the recommended population of 35,000 – 40,000 animals (0.6 per km2) for the country as a whole. Apart from culling the other suggested option to keep the elephant population under check is sterilization. Conservationists covering this area have also expressed concern at the large "deforestation, poaching and unsustainable resource exploitation" that is occurring in this national park attributed to political and economic instability in the country.

Kazuma Pan National Park
Basically, it was developed as a safe haven for the animals during the hunting season, as it formed an extension of the Matetsi Safari Area. It has a series of depressions, which enriches the ground water which is then pumped during the dry season. It has the largest concentration of about 2,000 buffaloes and also elephants and rhinos. Other species of wildlife seen here are: lion, leopard, giraffe, zebra, gemsbok, roan antelope, sable, tsessebe, eland and reedbuck. The oribi, a small antelope, an endemic species, is rarely sighted in the depressions where a large variety of water birds such as storks, crowned cranes, stilts, cormorants, ducks and kingfishers are also seen making it an attractive bird-watching site.

Mana Pools National Park

As the lakes gradually dry up and recede, the region attracts many large animals in search of water, making it one of Africa's most renowned game-viewing regions. In Shona language, ‘Mana’ means “four” referring to the four large permanent pools formed by the meandering ox-bow lakes of the middle Zambezi River. Dande Safari Area established in 1968, and the Urungwe Safari Area established in 1976 are contiguous to this park. The park's habitat consists of islands, sandbanks and pools, flanked by forests of mahogany, wild figs, ebonies and baobabs. Alluvial deposits along the Zambezi have winterthorn with more diverse woodlands with species of Kigelia africana and Trichelia emetica on the top alluvial layers. The park has the country's biggest concentration of hippopotamuses and crocodiles as well as large dry season mammal populations of elephant and Cape buffalo. Spotted hyena, honey badger, warthog, bushpig, plains zebra and many species of antelope are found here. Bird life consists of 380 species which includes Nyasa lovebird, western nicator, rock pratincole, banded snake-eagle and Livingstone's flycatcher.

Matusadona National Park
It is bounded on the south by the Omay communal, on the north by Lake Kariba, on the east by the Sanyati River and its gorge, and on the west by the Ume River. It has three ecological zones namely, the lake and shoreline grassland forming the first zone, the Zambezi Valley floor made up of a mass of thick jesse and mopane woodland (with sparse grass cover) as the second zone and; the Escarpment area of Julbernadia and Brachystegia woodlands constituting the third zone.

Black rhino, elephants and buffalo inhabit the park. Other species include night ape, honey badger, civet, small spotted genet, slender mongoose, banded mongoose, spotted hyena, serval, lion, leopard, yellow-spotted rock hyrax, black rhinoceros, zebra, warthog, common duiker, grysbok, klipspringer, waterbuck, bushbuck, scrub hare, porcupine, vervet monkey, chacma baboon, side-striped jackal, hippopotamus, roan antelope, kudu and bush squirrel, African clawless otter, white-tailed mongoose, reedbuck, sable antelope, eland, civet, rusty spotted genet, caracal and bush pig; sighted on rarely are Cape wild dog, cheetah, roan and pangolin.

Matobo National Park

It has an exclusive "Intensive Protection Zone" to protect the large population of black and white rhinoceros. The name Matobo means "bald heads" and was selected by the Matabeleland king Mzilikazi whose grave lies in the Matobo Hills close to the park.

Matobo Hills includes a range of domes, spires and balancing rock formations created erosion and weathering within a granite plateau. It has diverse species of vegetation, including examples of mopane, Acacia, Brachystegia, Ficus, Azanza, Ziziphus, Strychnos and Terminalia. Along with rhinoceros, the park supports also a large number of animal species, including zebra, wildebeest, giraffe, kudu, eland, sable antelope, klipspringer, leopard, hyena, cheetah, hippo, warthog, rock dassies, waterbuck, African wildcat, springhare, common duiker, crocodiles, baboons and monkeys. The park is also rich in bird life, including black eagle, African fish eagle, martial eagle, secretarybird, pied crow, Egyptian goose, francolin, and weavers. Fish species in the park include bass, bottle fish, bream, catfish and Melanochromis robustus. The park has a number of dams such as the Maleme Dam, the Mthselele Dam, the Toghwana Dam, the Mesilume Dam, which are all communal camp sites.

Nyanga National Park

It is rich in flora and fauna. The faunal species seen in the park are the waterbuck, wildebeest, kudu, zebra, impala, sables and eland. The rivers in the park have fresh water fish such as the Nyanga trout. The visitor attractions in the park are: The Mount Nyangani (2593 m), the Nyangombe Falls, Mutarazi Falls, Pungwe Gorge & Falls, Nyamuziwa Falls, Nyangwe & Chawomera Forts and the Trout Hatchery near Purdon Dam.

Victoria Falls and Zambezi National Park
The Victoria Falls and Zambezi National Parks, a UNESCO Natural World Heritage Site, are located on the western edge of Zimbabwe; the two together cover an area of  bounded by the Zambezi River, which borders with Zambia. The Falls and the Pa National Park are on the southern bank of the Zambezi River. The catchment area of the falls is made up of rainforests with rich and unique species of flora and fauna. The flora consists of species of fig, mahogany and date palm. The notable wildlife in the parks consists of elephants, lions, buffalos, leopards and white rhinoceros apart from herds of sable antelope, eland, zebra, giraffe, kudu, waterbuck and impala. The Zambezi River is rich in fish fauna such as bream and fighting tigerfish.

Vegetation
The vegetation or flora type is generally uniform in Zimbabwe. Bushveld or thorny acacia savanna and miombo or dry open woodland dominate the central and western plateau. In the south and southeast, which are dry lowlands, thorny scrub and baobabs are extensive. Cactus-like euphorbias (similar to pipe organs), 30 species of aloes, wildflowers, profusion of jacarandas, and succulent tropical flowers and palms are some of the plant species commonly seen in the country.

The dominant woody species noted in the Northwest Matebeleland, the Sebungwe region, in the Zambezi River Valley and in Gonarezhou National Park are: C. mopane, B. plurijuga, Guibourtia coleosperma, Pterocarpus angolensis and Acacia species, Julbernadia globiflora, Brachystegia boehmii, Erythrophleum africanum, P. angolensis, B. africana, Kirkia acuminata, Adansonia digitata, Screrocarya birrea, B. massaiensis, D. condylocarpon, T. sericea and Combretum species. Brachystegia allenii, J. globiflora, C. apiculatum, Terminali stuhlmannii, and Acacia tortlis, Grewia spp., Terminalia prunioides, S. birrea, Commiphora spp., A. nigrescence, A. digitata, and T. sericea.

Flora

Some of the floral; species of Zimbabwe are: Conyza sumatrensis, Hesperantha coccinea (river lily)  and Strychnos spinosa. Flame lily (genus Gloriosa). It grows profusely throughout the country and hence is designated as the national flower of Zimbabwe. It is a climbing lily which reaches heights of 8 ft and has bright red and yellow petals.

Fauna

Mammals

The mammal species reported in the entire wildlife of Zimbabwe (in national parks and reserves) including carnivores, bats, rodents and reptiles in that order are: African bush elephant (Loxodonta africana), African palm civet (Nandinia binotata), black duiker (Cephalophus niger), Burchell's zebra (Equus quagga burchellii), mbarapi (Hippotragus niger), suni (Neotragus moschatus), southern white rhinoceros (Ceratotherium simum simum), striped bush squirrel (Paraxerus flavovittis), southern African hedgehog (Atelerix frontalis), yellow-backed duiker (Cephalophus silvicultor), meerkat (Suricata suricatta), yellow baboon (Papio cynocephalus), blue duiker (Philantomba monticola), southern reedbuck (Redunca arundinum), Sharpe's grysbok (Raphicerus sharpei), spotted hyena (Crocuta crocuta), black-footed cat (Felis nigripes), striped polecat (Ictonyx striatus), African leopard (Panthera pardus pardus), lion (Panthera leo melanochaita), South African cheetah (Acinonyx jubatus jubatus), serval (Leptailurus serval), Cape wild dog (Lycaon pictus pictus), black-backed jackal (Canis mesomelas), large slit-faced bat (Nycteris grandis), lesser woolly bat (Kerivoula lanosa), Cape horseshoe bat (Rhinolophus capensis), Blasius's horseshoe bat (Rhinolophus blasii), little free-tailed bat (Chaerephon pumilus), eastern rock elephant shrew (Elephantulus myurus), short-snouted elephant shrew (Elephantulus brachyrhynchus), yellow mongoose (Cynictis penicillata), gray climbing mouse (Dendromus melanotis), pouched mouse (Saccostomus campestris) and Twig snake (Thelotornis kirtlandii).

Aqua fauna
Aqua fauna species reported are the Kafue pike characin (Hepsetus cuvieri) and African bullfrog (Pyxicephalus adspersus). Fish species particularly noted in the Mana Pools National Park are tigerfish, bream, vundu, nkupi, chessa, cornish jack, lungfish, foo goo fish.

Birds

The bird life in Zimbabwe consists of 685 species which included 10 globally threatened species and two introduced species.
The species found are of several families namely; one of Struthionidae (ostrich) Struthio camelus, 19 of Anatidae (one neatly threatened, Maccoa duck Oxyura maccoa), two of Numididae, 11 of Phasianidae, three of Podicipedidae, two of Phoenicopteridae (including one threatened species of lesser flamingo Phoenicopterus minor), eight Ciconiidae, two of Phalacrocoracidae, one of Anhingidae (African darter Anhinga rufa), two of Pelecanidae, one of Scopidae (hamerkop Scopus umbretta), 19 of Ardeidae (includes one slaty egret Egretta vinaceigula, vulnerable and one endangered species of Malagasy pond heron Ardeola idae), one of Scopidae (hamerkop Scopus umbretta, two Pelecanidae, two of Phalacrocoracidae, one of Anhingidae (darter Anhinga melanogaster), 13 of Falconidae (including lesser kestrel Falco naumann vulnerable species, three near threatened species namely, red-footed falcon Falco vespertinus, sooty falcon Falco concolor and Taita falcon Falco fasciinucha), 49 of Accipitridae (including one endangered species Egyptian vulture Neophron percnopterus, two vulnerable species namely, Cape griffon Gyps coprotheres and white-headed vulture Trigonoceps occipitalis and three near threatened species namely, African white-backed vulture Gyps africanus, southern banded snake-eagle Circaetus fasciolatus and pallid harrier Circus macrourus), five of Otididae (including one near threatened species Denham's bustard Neotis denhami), 18 of Rallidae (includes one endangered species white-winged flufftail Sarothrura ayresi and near threatened species corncrake Crex crex), one of Heliornithidae (African finfoot Podica senegalensis species), two of Gruidae (including vulnerable species wattled crane Bugeranus carunculatus), two of Turnicidae, two of Burhinidae, two of Recurvirostridae, 18 of Charadriidae (including one near threatened species chestnut-banded plover Charadrius pallidus), one of Rostratulidae (greater painted-snipe Rostratula benghalensis species), two of Jacanidae, 24 of Scolopacidae (including three nearly threatened species, great snipe Gallinago media, black-tailed godwit Limosa limosa and Eurasian curlew Numenius arquata), five of Glareolidae (including one near threatened species black-winged pratincole Glareola nordmanni), nine Laridae (including one near threatened species African skimmer Rynchops flavirostris), four Pteroclidae, 14 of Columbidae (including one introduced species rock dove Columba livia), four of Psittacidae (including one threatened species Nyasa lovebird Agapornis lilianae), five of Musophagidae, 18 of Cuculidae, two of Tytonidae, 10 of Strigidae, seven of Caprimulgidae, 11 of Apodidae, two of Coliidae, one of Trogonidae (Narina's trogon Apaloderma narina species), five of Coraciidae (including one near threatened species European roller Coracias garrulus), nine of Alcedinidae, eight of Meropidae, one of Upupidae (common hoopoe Upupa epops species), two of Phoeniculidae, eight of Bucerotidae, one of Bucorvidae (southern ground hornbill Bucorvus leadbeateri species), seven of Ramphastidae, six of Indicatoridae, seven of Picidae, one of Eurylaimidae (African broadbill Smithornis capensis species), one of Pittidae (African pitta Pitta angolensis species), six of Platysteiridae, three of Prionopidae, 16 of Malaconotidae, three of Campephagidae, five of Laniidae, four of Oriolidae, two of Dicruridae, three of Monarchidae, three of Corvidae, two of Nicatoridae, 12 of Alaudidae (including near threatened species Latakoo lark Mirafra cheniana), 18 of Hirundinidae (including one vulnerable species blue swallow Hirundo atrocaerulea), three of Stenostiridae, five of Paridae, two of Remizidae, one of Certhiidae (spotted creeper Salpornis salvadori species), nine of Pycnonotidae, two of Phylloscopidae, 11 of Acrocephalidae, three of Megaluridae, 31 of Cisticolidae, nine of Sylviidae, one of Promeropidae (Gurney's sugarbird Promerops gurneyi species), one of Hyliotidae (southern hyliota Hyliota australis species), 31 of Muscicapidae (including one vulnerable species Swynnerton's robin Swynnertonia swynnertoni), five of Turdidae, three of Timaliidae, one of Zosteropidae (southern yellow white-eye Zosterops anderssoni species), 10 of Sturnidae, two of Buphagidae, 16 of Nectariniidae (including one near threatened species plain-backed sunbird Anthreptes reichenowi), 19 of Motacillidae, five of Emberizidae, eight of Fringillidae, five of Passeridae, 24 of Ploceidae, 25 of Estrildidae and nine of Viduidae.

Some the prominent bird species reported by the website of University of Michigan Museum of Zoology are; common swift (Apus apus), kori bustard (Ardeotis kori), grey crowned crane (Balearica regulorum), pied kingfisher (Ceryle rudis), great spotted cuckoo (Clamator glandarius), South African galago (Galago moholi), Nycteris grandis, martial eagle (Polemaetus bellicosus), yellow-fronted canary (Serinus mozambicus), Swynnertonia swynnertoni and black-rumped buttonquail (Turnix nanus). One-third of the world's eagle species are reported from the Matobo National Park. Buff-spotted flufftail and stripe-cheeked bulbuls are seen across the country. The bateleur eagle is the only member of the genu Terathopius and probably the origin of the "Zimbabwe Bird", the national emblem of Zimbabwe.

References

External links

Biota of Zimbabwe
Zimbabwe